George Clifford "Jew Baby" Bennette (February 22, 1901 – November 7, 1984) was an American baseball left fielder in the Negro leagues. He played with several teams from 1921 to 1932.

References

External links
 and Baseball-Reference Black Baseball stats and Seamheads

Columbus Buckeyes players
Indianapolis ABCs players
Detroit Stars players
Dayton Marcos players
Cleveland Cubs players
Louisville Black Caps players
1901 births
1984 deaths
Baseball players from Illinois
Baseball outfielders
20th-century African-American sportspeople